The African oystercatcher or African black oystercatcher (Haematopus moquini),  is a large charismatic wader resident to the mainland coasts and offshore islands of southern Africa. This near-threatened oystercatcher has a population of over 6,000 adults, which breed between November and April. The scientific name moquini commemorates the French naturalist Alfred Moquin-Tandon who discovered and named this species before Bonaparte.

Description

The African oystercatcher is a large, noisy wader, with completely black plumage, red legs and a strong broad red bill. The sexes are similar in appearance, however, females are larger and have a slightly longer beak than males. Juveniles have soft grey plumage and do not express the characteristic red legs and beak until after they fledged. The call is a distinctive loud piping, very similar to Eurasian oystercatchers. As the Eurasian oystercatcher is a migratory species they only occur as a vagrant in southern Africa, and its black-and-white plumage makes confusion impossible.

Average measurements 
Body Length: 
Wingspan: 
Mass: ♂  ♀ 
Tarsus: 
Culmen:

Distribution and habitat

The African oystercatcher is native to the mainland coasts and offshore islands of Southern Africa sometimes occurring as a vagrant in Angola and Mozambique. Its breeding range extends from Lüderitz, Namibia to Mazeppa Bay, Eastern Cape, South Africa. There are estimated to be over 6,000 adult birds in total.

Typically sedentary African oystercatchers rarely leave their territories, which include a nesting site and feeding grounds. These will usually be located on or near rocky shores where they can feed.

Ecology

Feeding
African oystercatchers predominantly feed on molluscs such as mussels and limpets, although are known to also feed on polychaetes, insects and potentially even fish. They are adapted to pry open mussels and loosen limpets off the rocks but have been recorded picking through sand to locate other food items.

Breeding
On rock ledges there may be a rim of shells to keep the eggs in place. The female generally lays two  eggs, but there may be one or three, which are incubated by both adults. The incubation period varies between 27 and 39 days and the young take a further 38 or so days to fledge. Breeding success is greater on offshore islands where there are few predators and less disturbance than mainland sites.

Longevity and mortality
The lifespan of an African oystercatcher is about 35 years, of which they are known to pair up for 25 years. Although adults are rarely predated most mainland egg and chick fatalities are due to disturbance by people, off-road vehicles, dog attacks and predation by the kelp gull (Larus dominicanus) and other avian predators. Offshore pairs experience similar avian predation although most chicks perish due to starvation.

Status
As of December 2017 the global IUCN assessment of the African oystercatcher's status is "Least Concern". The population trend seems to be upward as the local community becomes more involved in adopting conservation measures. In South Africa, the species has also been downlisted to Least Concern. A long-term program by the South African Ringing Scheme is tracking the dispersal of ringed birds to keep conservation assessments in South Africa and Namibia up to date.

Gallery

References

External links

 Species text in The Atlas of Southern African Birds.
 Birdlife Information site.
 Archive Information site.
 Two Oceans Aquarium Information site
 Reporting of resightings of ringed birds at SAFRING

African oystercatcher
African oystercatcher
Birds of Southern Africa
African oystercatcher
African oystercatcher